Mebygda or Sørli is a village in Lierne municipality in Trøndelag county, Norway. The village is located on the southeast shore of the lake Lenglingen. The village was the administrative centre of the old municipality of Sørli from 1915 until its dissolution in 1964. The Sørli Church is located in Mebygda.

References

Villages in Trøndelag
Lierne